The 2010 Gold Coast Titans season was the 4th in the club's history and they competed in the NRL's 2010 Telstra Premiership. They were coached by John Cartwright and captain by Scott Prince. Gold Coast finishing the regular season 4th (out of 16) and fell just one game short of the Grand Final losing to the Sydney Roosters in the Preliminary Final.

Season summary 
The Gold Coast Titans began the season with a come-from-behind 24–18 victory against the New Zealand Warriors at home. A golden point win over Souths followed, in what was a long match that didn't finish until around 11:30pm Queensland time (10:30pm Sydney time; as the match kicked off at 8:30pm). A 24–4 win over the Canberra Raiders at home followed before the Titans lost its first match of the season against the North Queensland Cowboys in Townsville. The Titans bounced back a week later to beat the Melbourne Storm at home before stumbling against the St. George Illawarra Dragons in round six. The Titans then had a three-match winning streak before stumbling against rivals Brisbane in round ten, the Sydney Roosters in round 12 and the Canberra Raiders in round 13. The Titans got back on track with a 28–14 win over the Manly-Warringah Sea Eagles at home, which was backed up with a win over the Bulldogs in round 15 before an unexpected defeat against the Newcastle Knights at home the following round. This trigged the Titans' second three-match losing streak in the season, however the Titans would emerge from their form slump and the dreaded State of Origin period with a golden point 11–10 victory over the Dragons at Kogarah where neither of the Gold Coast franchises had never won. They would lose only one more game for the rest of the regular season, against battlers Cronulla in Cronulla in the penultimate round of the season in what was also Greg Bird's return to the Shire since the Sharks sacked him in 2008.

Finishing fourth at the end of the season (a place lower than their 3rd finish in 2009), the Titans, as the only Queensland representation in the finals, entered the finals series with high expectations. They defeated the New Zealand Warriors easily 28–16 and as a result earned a week off (two of the top three teams lost on the weekend) and a home preliminary final at Suncorp Stadium. Unfortunately, the Titans saved their worst for last, losing 32–6 against the Sydney Roosters who progressed to the Grand Final a season after finishing last.

Players

Paul Broughton Medal 
After playing the Titans last few matches of the 2010 NRL season with a broken thumb, Luke Bailey was awarded his second Paul Broughton Medal for the club's player of the year.

Squad Movement

Gains

Losses

Re-signings

Ladder

Fixtures

Trial matches

Regular season

Finals

Statistics

Representative honours 
The following players have played a representative match during the 2010 NRL Season.

Australian Kangaroos
 Greg Bird

Indigenous All Stars
 Greg Bird
 Scott Prince

NRL All Stars
 Luke Bailey

NSW Country Origin
 Greg Bird
 Anthony Laffranchi

NSW City Origin
 Mark Minichiello
 John Cartwright (Coach)

NSW Blues
 Greg Bird

QLD Maroons
 Ashley Harrison

References 

Gold Coast Titans seasons
Gold Coast Titans season